Janet Ahlberg (21 October 1944 – 15 November 1994; née Hall) and Allan Ahlberg (born 5 June 1938) were a British married couple who created many children's books, including picture books that regularly appear at the top of "most popular" lists for public libraries. They worked together for 20 years until Janet's death from cancer in 1994. He wrote the books and she illustrated them. Allan Ahlberg has also written dozens of books with other illustrators.

Janet Ahlberg won two Kate Greenaway Medals for illustrating their books and the 1978 winner Each Peach Pear Plum was named one of the top ten winning works for the 50th anniversary of the Medal (1955–2005). In the US it was published by Viking Press in 1979 as Each Peach Pear Plum: an "I Spy" story; the national library catalogue summary explains, "Rhymed text and illustrations invite the reader to play 'I spy' with a variety of Mother Goose and other folklore characters."

Biography

Allan Ahlberg was born 5 June 1938 in Croydon. An illegitimate child, he was adopted and brought up in Oldbury, in Sandwell in the West Midlands. He has called it "a very poor working-class family" and identified himself as the baby in Peepo! (1981). He grew up with "no books and not much conversation".

Janet Hall was born 21 October 1944 in Yorkshire and brought up in Leicester. The Ahlbergs both trained as teachers at Sunderland Technical College, where they met during the 1960s and married in 1969.

Janet illustrated My Growing Up Book by Bernard Garfinkel (New York: Platt & Munk, 1972), which the US Library of Congress calls "A child's record of the things he has learned and done from the time of birth through age five. Also provides a place to paste photographs."

Their joint work began when she asked him, a primary school teacher, to write a story.
The first three published Ahlberg collaborations appeared in 1976 and 1977, The Old Joke Book, The Vanishment of Thomas Tull, and Burglar Bill (1977). Vanishment was bound in hardcover with a dustjacket, while many of their early works were "pictorial laminated boards". For Each Peach Pear Plum (Kestrel), Janet won the 1978 Kate Greenaway Medal from the British Library Association, recognising the year's best children's book illustration by a British subject. For the 50th anniversary of the Medal, a 2007 panel named it one of the top ten winning works, which composed the ballot for a public election of the nation's favourite. Each Peach Pear Plum finished a close second to the 1977 medalist, Dogger by Shirley Hughes; the margin was 1% of the vote.

Probably their greatest success was The Jolly Postman, published by Heinemann in 1986; Allan Ahlberg told The Guardian in 2006 that it had sold over six million copies. It made innovative use of envelopes to include letters, cards, games and a tiny book. According to one WorldCat library record,
"A Jolly Postman delivers letters to several famous fairy-tale characters such as the Big Bad Wolf, Cinderella, and the Three Bears. Twelve of the pages have been made into six envelopes and contain eight letters and cards. Each letter may be removed from its envelope page and read separately." Its first-listed Library of Congress Subject Heading (US) is "Toy and movable books".

The Jolly Postman required five years to make, and much discussion with the Heinemann and the printer before it was issued in 1986. It won many awards including the Kurt Maschler Award for integrated writing and illustration. There were two sequels, The Jolly Christmas Postman (1991), for which Janet won her second Greenaway Medal, and The Jolly Pocket Postman (1995).

Working together, the Ahlbergs produced many popular books for a range of ages. Some, such as Peepo! and The Baby's Catalogue are aimed at babies and toddlers. For older children, they wrote books such as Burglar Bill, Cops and Robbers, Funnybones and the Happy Families series. Allan also wrote two books of verses, Heard it in the Playground and Please, Mrs Butler, which Janet illustrated, and more text-heavy books such as Woof!.

Janet died of breast cancer in November 1994 at the age of 50, when their daughter Jessica was 15 years old. Allan Ahlberg says with regret that they "made an absolute fortune" but "never really had holidays".

Allan later married his editor, Vanessa Clarke of Walker Books, his new publisher. As of 2017, he is the author of more than 150 published books, including two in 2004 illustrated by his daughter Jessica, who now creates picture books with other writers including Toon Tellegen. Father and daughter have recently collaborated again, completing a movable picture book published late in 2012, The Goldilocks Variations (Walker), "a new twist in an old fairy tale".

Allan Ahlberg is a supporter of West Bromwich Albion F.C., having grown up in the neighbouring town to West Bromwich.

Recognition

Beside the two Greenaway Medals, Janet Ahlberg was a "Commended" runner up three times, for Burglar Bill (1977), The Baby's Catalogue (1982), and The Jolly Postman (1986).
According to Allan, their daughter Jessica inspired the latter two, and his own "Burglar Bill" book is autobiographical, The Boyhood of Burglar Bill (Puffin, 2007). A football story set in war-ravaged England, Boyhood made the Guardian Children's Fiction Prize shortlist.

Allan appeared as a castaway on the BBC Radio programme Desert Island Discs on 14 November 2008. He described their work together, her illness and death, and the creation of Janet's Last Book.

From July to September 2011, Janet and Allan's work was celebrated at The Public arts centre in Sandwell (which encompasses Allan's hometown Oldbury). The exhibition included works by schoolchildren with local artists "in response to" Ahlberg stories.

In July 2014, Allan Ahlberg declined the (inaugural) Booktrust Best Book Awards 'Lifetime Achievement Award' (which has a 5000 GBP prize attached). He cited ethical grounds related to the award's principal sponsor Amazon.com. In a letter to The Bookseller he stated that "Booktrust does good work and has a well-deserved reputation ... For my part, the idea that my "lifetime achievement"— i.e. the books (and all of Janet's work too)—should have the Amazon tag attached to it is unacceptable."

Allan Ahlberg sits on the Council of the Society of Authors.

Selected works

By Janet and Allan Ahlberg

Bookseller World mentions about 80 "UK First Editions Books" by Janet and Allan. Five series comprise more than 40 books, none published by Kestrel or Viking; 35 singletons include 8 published by Kestrel (a Viking imprint) from 1976 to 1983, and 12 published by Viking from 1984 to 1994.

 Brick Street Boys (Collins, 1975) — five volumes
 The Old Joke Book (Kestrel, 1976) — board book
 Burglar Bill (Heinemann, 1977) — board book
 Jeremiah in the Dark Woods (Kestrel, 1977) — board book
 The Vanishment of Thomas Tull (Black, 1977) — with dust jacket
 Cops and Robbers (Heinemann, 1978)
 Each Peach Pear Plum (Kestrel, 1978)
 The One and Only Two Heads (Collins, 1979)
 Son of a Gun (Heinemann, 1979)
 The Little Worm Book (Granada, 1979)
 Two Wheels Two Heads (Collins, 1979)
 Funny Bones (Heinemann, 1980)
 A Pair of Sinners (Granada, 1980)

 Happy Families (Puffin, 1980) 
 Peepo! (also released as Peek-A-Boo! in a US version) (Kestrel, 1981)
 The Ha Ha Bonk Book (Kestrel, 1982)
 Help Your Child to Read (Granada, 1982)
 The Baby's Catalogue (Kestrel, 1982)
 Ditto Frieze (1982)
 Ten in a Bed (Granada, 1983)
 Please Mrs Butler (Kestrel, 1983)
 Daisy Chains (Heinemann, 1983) 
 Yum Yum (Viking, 1984)
 Playmates (Viking, 1984)
 Foldaways (Viking, 1984)
 Red Nose Readers (Walker, 1985) 
 Woof (Viking, 1986)
 The Cinderella Show (Viking, 1986)
 The Jolly Postman (Heinemann, 1986)
 The Clothes Horse and Other Stories (Viking, 1987)
 The Mighty Slide (Viking, 1988)
 Starting School (Viking, 1988)
 Heard it in the Playground (Viking, 1989)
 Bye Bye Baby (Heinemann, 1989)
 Funny Bones Early Readers (Heinemann, 1990) 
 The Jolly Christmas Postman (Heinemann, 1991)
 The Bear Nobody Wanted (Viking, 1992)
 Mrs. Butler Songbook (Viking, 1992)
 It Was a Dark and Stormy Night (Viking, 1993)
 The Giant Baby (Viking, 1994)

 The Jolly Pocket Postman (1995)
The Baby's Catalogue series, American Board Book editions, copyright 1982
 Baby Sleeps (1998)
 Blue Buggy (1998)
 Doll and Teddy (1998)
 See the Rabbit (1998)

Written by Allan Ahlberg

Most of these books were illustrated by other people, except My Brother's Ghost.

 Mr. Cosmo the Conjurer (1980)
 Please Mrs. Butler (1983)
 Woof! (1986)
 The Cinderella Show (1986)
 Heard it in the Playground (1989)
 The Giant Baby (1994)
 The Better Brown Stories (1995)
 The Night Train (1996)
 Janet's Last Book (1997)
 The Snail House (2000)
 Friendly Matches (2001)
 My Brother's Ghost (2001)
 The Man Who Wore All His Clothes (2001)
 The Adventures of Bert (2001), illustrated by Raymond Briggs
 The Woman who Won Things (2002)

 The Improbable Cat (2002)
 A Bit More Bert (2002), illustrated by Raymond Briggs
 Half a Pig (2004), illustrated by Jessica Ahlberg
 The Boy, the Wolf, the Sheep and the Lettuce: A Little Search for Truth??? (2004), illus. Jessica Ahlberg
 The Runaway Dinner (2006)
 The Boyhood of Burglar Bill (2007) — autobiographical post-war football story
 Previously (2007)
 The Pencil (2008)
 The Baby in the Hat (2008)

 Everybody Was a Baby Once and Other Poems (2010)
 Goldilocks Variations (2012), illus. Jessica Ahlberg
 Hooray for Bread 2014

Translated

 Starting School – French: Le livre de tous les écoliers

See also
 
 Movable book
 Toy book

Notes

References

Further reading
 D. Martin, "Janet & Allan Ahlberg", in Douglas Martin, The Telling Line: Essays on Fifteen Contemporary Book Illustrators (Julia MacRae Books, 1989), pp. 264–78
 Allan Ahlberg, Janet's Last Book: Janet Ahlberg 1944–1994: a Memento (Privately published, 1996; Penguin Books, November 1997)
 Wendy Lynch, Janet and Allan Ahlberg (Oxford: Heinemann Library, 2000) — a 24-page biography, illustrated

External links
 
 
 Jessica Ahlberg at LC Authorities, 3 records
 Allan, Janet, and Jessica Ahlberg in libraries (WorldCat catalogue)

British children's writers
Married couples
Children's poets